The 2016 SWF Scottish Cup is the national cup competition in Scottish women's football. All teams in the Scottish Women's Football League and SWPL 1 & 2 are eligible to enter.

Hibernian won the final after penalties against Glasgow City, who had won the cup for the previous five years.

Format
Teams are either drawn into the first round or receive a bye, so that there are 16 matches to play in the Second round. The winners of the first round then are joined by the 16 SWPL 1 & 2 teams in the second round.

First round
30 of 32 teams were drawn into this round. Edinburgh Caledonia & Dumbarton United received a bye to the second round.

Second round
SWPL teams enter.

Third round

Quarter-finals

Semi-finals

Final
Hibernian won their fifth Scottish Cup.

References

External links
 Cup season at soccerway.com

Scottish Women's Cup
Scottish Women's Cup
Scotland